The 2022 Città di Forlì was a professional tennis tournament played on hard courts. It was the third edition of the tournament which was part of the 2022 ATP Challenger Tour. It took place in Forlì, Italy between 3 and 9 January 2022.

Singles main-draw entrants

Seeds

 1 Rankings as of 27 December 2021.

Other entrants
The following players received wildcards into the singles main draw:
  Lorenzo Angelini
  Stefano Napolitano
  Luca Potenza

The following players received entry into the singles main draw using protected rankings:
  Lucas Catarina
  Jeremy Jahn

The following player received entry into the singles main draw as an alternate:
  Hsu Yu-hsiou

The following players received entry from the qualifying draw:
  Elliot Benchetrit
  Alexandar Lazarov
  Mukund Sasikumar
  Aldin Šetkić
  Michael Vrbenský
  Denis Yevseyev

The following player received entry as a lucky loser:
  Adrian Andreev

Champions

Singles

 Luca Nardi def.  Mukund Sasikumar 6–3, 6–1.

Doubles

 Marco Bortolotti /  Arjun Kadhe def.  Michael Geerts /  Alexander Ritschard 7–6(7–5), 6–2.

References

Città di Forlì
January 2022 sports events in Italy
2022 in Italian sport